TZ Cassiopeaie (TZ Cas, HIP 117763, SAO 20912) is a variable star in the constellation Cassiopeia with an apparent magnitude of around +9 to +10. It is approximately 8,400 light-years away from Earth.  The star is a red supergiant star with a spectral type of M3 and a temperature below .

TZ Cassiopeiae was reported as being variable by Williamina Fleming and published posthumously in 1911.  It is a slow irregular variable star with a possible period of 3,100 days.  It is over 90,000 times the luminosity of the Sun, and it is 767 times larger than the Sun. It is a member of the Cas OB5 stellar association, together with the nearby red supergiant PZ Cassiopeiae.

TZ Cas is losing mass through a powerful stellar wind at two millionths of a solar mass each year.  It is unclear whether this is sufficient to cause the star to lose its atmosphere and become a blue supergiant before the core exhausts its fuel and collapses as a supernova.  Either as a red or blue supergiant, or a Wolf–Rayet star, it will inevitably end its life violently in a supernova explosion when the core collapse occurs.

References 

Cassiopeia (constellation)
Slow irregular variables
M-type supergiants
Cassiopeiae, TZ
117763
BD+60 2634
J23525623+6100083